The 1982 Benson & Hedges Championships, also known as the Wembley Championships,  was a men's tennis tournament played on indoor carpet courts at the Wembley Arena in London, England that was part of the 1982 Volvo Grand Prix. It was the seventh edition of the tournament and was held from 8 November until 14 November 1982. First-seeded John McEnroe won the singles title.

Finals

Singles
 John McEnroe defeated  Brian Gottfried 6–3, 6–2, 6–4
 It was McEnroe's 5th singles title of the year and the 39th of his career.

Doubles
 John McEnroe /  Peter Fleming defeated  Heinz Günthardt /  Tomáš Šmíd 7–6, 6–4

References

External links
 ITF tournament edition details

Benson and Hedges Championships
Wembley Championships
Benson and Hedges Championships
Benson and Hedges Championships
Benson and Hedges Championships
Tennis in London